Klein Vierstraat British Cemetery is a Commonwealth War Graves Commission (CWGC) burial ground for the dead of the First World War located in the Ypres Salient on the Western Front in Belgium.

The cemetery grounds were assigned to the United Kingdom in perpetuity by King Albert I of Belgium in recognition of the sacrifices made by the British Empire in the defence and liberation of Belgium during the war.  The cemetery is approximately 0.3 hectares in size. The Kemmel Number 1 French Cemetery, also a First World War burial ground assigned to the United Kingdom, is located approximately 50 m to the east.

Foundation
The cemetery was founded in January 1917 by fighting units and field ambulances.

It was used after the Armistice to concentrate battlefield burials and Ferme Henri Pattyn Vanlaeres and Mont-Vidaigne Military cemeteries. An American soldier was buried here, but his body was later moved to Lijssenthoek Military Cemetery.

Within the cemetery is a Cross of Sacrifice.

The cemetery was designed by Sir Edwin Lutyens.

References

External links
 
 Klein-Vierstraat British Cemetery at Find a Grave

Commonwealth War Graves Commission cemeteries in Belgium
World War I cemeteries in Belgium
Cemeteries and memorials in West Flanders
Works of Edwin Lutyens in Belgium